

Overall Reaction
The Forster–Decker Method is a series of chemical reactions that transform a primary amine (1) ultimately to a secondary amine (6). The first step is the formation of a Schiff base (3), followed by alkylation, and hydrolysis.

Mechanism 
1. The first step in the Forster-Decker Method is the formation of an imine (Schiff base) from a primary amine. 
 Step A: Nucleophilic attack on the aldehyde by a primary amine
 Step B: Proton Transfer - creating carbinolamine
 Step C: Protonation of hydroxyl oxygen of carbinolamine 
 Step D: Formation of iminium ion by losing water molecule
 Step E: Deprotonation giving imine product

2. The next step is alkylation of the imine product to form iminium ion.
 Step F: Alkylation of imine product with X-R' where X = Cl, Br or I

3. The final step is hydrolysis of the iminium ion to form a secondary amine and regenerate the aldehyde starting material. 
 Step G: Nucleophilic attack by a water molecule
 Step H: Proton transfers: shown in the mechanism using two molecules (water and acid) but this step might also be intramolecular
 Step I: Reformation of carbonyl and kicking out the secondary amine
 Step J: Deprotonation to regenerate aldehyde starting material

See also

 Reductive amination

References

Substitution reactions
Name reactions